Professor David Judge (born 22 May 1950), is a British political scientist based at the University of Strathclyde, where he is Emeritus Professor in the School of Government and Public Policy. His main research interests include legislative studies, United Kingdom political institutions, the European Parliament and representative democracy. 

He was visiting professor, College of Europe, Bruges (2004-7), and University of Houston (1993-4).

Selected bibliography

Books
 
 
 
 Judge, David and Earnshaw, David. The European Parliament, Palgrave Macmillan, May 2003. Second edition published 2008. 
 
Judge, David (2014) Democratic Incongruities: Representative Democracy in Britain:Democratic Incongruities: Palgrave Macmillan. 
Recent Articles

References 

1950 births
Academics of the University of Strathclyde
British political scientists
Academic staff of the College of Europe
Living people